Saint-Cyrille-de-Wendover is a Quebec municipality located in the Drummond Regional County Municipality just east of Drummondville in the Centre-du-Quebec region. The population as of the Canada 2011 Census was 4,389. The town is located alongside the Rivière des Saults.

The town was previously known as Saint-Cyrille which was created in 1905. It was merged in 1982 with the townships of Wendover and Simpson to form the current name. Being located in the middle of numerous townships and valleys, agriculture is a predominant activity in the municipality.

Demographics

Population
Population trend:

Language
Mother tongue language (2006)

Transportation
Saint-Cyrille-de-Wendover's main transportation link is Quebec Route 122 which travels through most of the Centre-du-Quebec towards Victoriaville to the east and the Yamaska area in the west north of Autoroute 20, the main Autoroute of the province which travels a few kilometers to the north of town.

See also
 List of municipalities in Quebec

References

External links
 Website of the municipality of Saint-Cyrille-de-Wendover
 Regional Map of the Saint-Cyrile-de-Wendover area

Municipalities in Quebec
Incorporated places in Centre-du-Québec